The women's vault gymnastic event at the 2019 Pan American Games was held on July 30 at the Polideportivo Villa el Salvador.

Schedule
All times are Eastern Standard Time (UTC-3).

Results

Final

Fourth place qualifier, Aleah Finnegan of the United States, withdrew from the competition due to injury. She was replaced by first reserve, Marcia Vidiaux of Cuba.

Qualification

References

Gymnastics at the 2019 Pan American Games
Pan American Games 2019